The 1899 Iowa Hawkeyes football team represented the University of Iowa in the 1899 college football season.

Schedule

References

Iowa
Iowa Hawkeyes football seasons
College football undefeated seasons
Iowa Hawkeyes football